Daniel Burkett (born February 25, 1995) is a Canadian racing driver who currently competes in the Continental Tire Sports Car Challenge for CJ Wilson Racing.

Career history

After karting in various series Burkett made his open wheel debut in 2013. His first race was the opening round of the 2013 U.S. F2000 Winterfest. During the three races he finished fifteenth, seventeenth and thirteenth. He started in the regular USF2000 season for Belardi Auto Racing. After a rough start of the season Burkett improved and was a regular top-ten finisher. His best result was a fifth-place finish at Mazda Raceway Laguna Seca. He finished fifteenth in the standings. During the 2014 Winterfest Burkett returned to the series in the final round at Barber Motorsports Park. Burkett made his debut in the Atlantic Championship with K-Hill Motorsports in 2014. He swept the opening round at Road Atlanta winning both races. He has also signed on to compete in a second season of U.S. F2000 with Belardi in 2014 which saw him improve to 11th in the standings with three fourth-place finishes. Daniel signed with Cape Motorsports with Wayne Taylor Racing for the 2015 MRTI Pro Mazda series. In 2016, Daniel will race in the Continental Tire Sports Car Challenge with CJ Wilson Racing with Marc Miller as his co-driver. They will drive the #33 Porsche GT4 Cayman Clubsport in the GS class. They finished third in the season opener at Daytona as a fuel issue held them back from victory.

Racing record

U.S. F2000 National Championship

Atlantic Championship Series

Pro Mazda Championship

External links
Personal Web Page
U.S. F2000 Bio
Canadian star Burkett joins Belardi Auto Racing 

1995 births
Atlantic Championship drivers
Canadian racing drivers
Living people
Indy Pro 2000 Championship drivers
Racing drivers from Manitoba
Sportspeople from Winnipeg
U.S. F2000 National Championship drivers
Belardi Auto Racing drivers
Wayne Taylor Racing drivers
Michelin Pilot Challenge drivers